WWPZ-LP (95.9 FM) was a radio station licensed to Newberry, South Carolina, United States. The station was owned by Newberry Minority Broadcast Coalition.

WWPZ-LP went silent on May 27, 2014. On July 21, 2015, the Federal Communications Commission (FCC) wrote the station to advise that their license was considered expired effective May 28, 2015, due to the station having remained silent for more than twelve months. The station's call sign was deleted from the FCC's database on September 2, 2015.

References

External links
 

WPZ-LP
WPZ-LP
Radio stations established in 2004
2004 establishments in South Carolina
Defunct radio stations in the United States
Radio stations disestablished in 2015
2015 disestablishments in South Carolina
WPZ-LP